Gaspar or Gaspare DiGregorio (October 4, 1905 – June 11, 1970) was a New York mobster and a high-ranking member of the Bonanno crime family who was a key figure in the "Banana War".

In October 1964, during Joseph Bonanno's two-year absence, Bonanno soldier DiGregorio took advantage of family discontent over Joseph's son Bill Bonanno's role to claim family leadership. The Mafia Commission named DiGregorio as Bonanno family boss, and the DiGregorio revolt led to four years of strife in the Bonanno family, labeled by the media as the "Banana War". This led to a divide in the family between loyalists to Bill and loyalists to DiGregorio.

In early 1966, DiGregorio allegedly contacted Bill about having a peace meeting. Bill agreed and suggested his grand-uncle's house on Troutman Street in Brooklyn as a meeting site. On January 28, 1966, as Bill and his loyalists approached the house, they were met with gunfire; no one was wounded during this confrontation.

In 1968, DiGregorio was wounded by machine gun fire and later suffered a heart attack. The Commission eventually became dissatisfied with DiGregorio's efforts at quelling the family rebellion, and eventually dropped DiGregorio and swung their support to Paul Sciacca. In 1968, after a heart attack, Joseph ended the family warfare by agreeing to retire as boss and move to Arizona. As part of this peace agreement, Bill also resigned as consigliere and moved out of New York with his father.

On June 15, 1970, Gaspar DiGregorio died of lung cancer at St. John's Episcopal Hospital in Smithtown, New York. He is buried in Saint Charles Cemetery in Farmingdale, New York Section 30, Row X, Grave #60.
Jesse Digregorio Nadler  ( Known Family associate ) Left New York City in the Mid 1990's for New Orleans,,South Florida and California-

He is portrayed by Richard D'Alessandro in Season 3 of TV Series Godfather of Harlem.

References

Further reading
Bernstein, Lee. The Greatest Menace: Organized Crime in Cold War America. Boston: UMass Press, 2002. 
Bonanno, Bill. Bound by Honor: A Mafioso's Story. New York: St. Martin's Press, 1999. 
Bonanno, Joseph. A Man of Honor: The Autobiography of Joseph Bonanno. New York: St. Martin's Press, 2003. 
Capeci, Jerry. The Complete Idiot's Guide to the Mafia. Indianapolis: Alpha Books, 2002.

External links
The American "Mafia": Who was who ? - Gaspar DiGregorio
Court TV Crime Library: The Banana War

 

1905 births
1970 deaths
American gangsters of Italian descent
Bonanno crime family
Bosses of the Bonanno crime family
Deaths from lung cancer in New York (state)
American crime bosses